In mathematics, a covering set for a sequence of integers refers to a set of prime numbers such that every term in the sequence is divisible by at least one member of the set.  The term "covering set" is used only in conjunction with sequences possessing exponential growth.

Sierpinski and Riesel numbers
The use of the term "covering set" is related to Sierpinski and Riesel numbers.

These covering sets form from prime numbers that in base 2 have short periods. To achieve a complete covering set, Wacław Sierpiński showed that a sequence can repeat no more frequently than every 24 numbers. A repeat every 24 numbers give the covering set }, while a repeat every 36 terms can give several covering sets: }; }; } and }.

Riesel numbers have the same covering sets as Sierpinski numbers.

Other covering sets
Covering sets (thus Sierpinski numbers and Riesel numbers) also exists for bases other than 2.

Covering sets are also used to prove the existence of composite generalized Fibonacci sequences with first two terms coprime (primefree sequence), such as the sequence starting with 20615674205555510 and 3794765361567513.

The concept of a covering set can easily be generalised to other sequences which turn out to be much simpler.

In the following examples + is used as it is in regular expressions to mean 1 or more. For example, 91+3 means the set }.

An example are the following eight sequences:
 (29·10n − 191) / 9 or 32+01
 (37·10n + 359) / 9 or 41+51
 (46·10n + 629) / 9 or 51+81
 (59·10n − 293) / 9 or 65+23
 (82·10n + 17) / 9 or 91+3
 (85·10n + 41) / 9 or 94+9
 (86·10n + 31) / 9 or 95+9
 (89·10n + 593) / 9 or 98+23

In each case, every term is divisible by one of the primes from the set }. These primes can be said to form a covering set exactly analogous to Sierpinski and Riesel numbers. The covering set } is found for several similar sequences, including:
 (38·10n − 137) / 9 or 42+07
 (4·10n − 337) / 9 or 4+07
 (73·10n + 359) / 9 or 81+51

 9175·10n + 1 or 91750+1
 10176·10n − 1 or 101759+
 (334·10n − 1)/9 or 371+
 (12211·10n − 1)/3 or 40703+
 (8026·10n − 7)/9 or 8917+

Also for bases other than 10:

 521·12n + 1 or 3750+1 in duodecimal
 (1288·12n − 1)/11 or 991+ in duodecimal
 (4517·12n − 7)/11 or 2X27+ in duodecimal
 376·12n − 1 or 273E+ in duodecimal

The covering set of them is }

An even simpler case can be found in the sequence:

 (76·10n − 67) / 99 (n must be odd) or (76)+7 (Sequence: 7, 767, 76767, 7676767, 767676767 etc.)

Here, it can be shown that if:
 w is of form : (76)+7 is divisible by 7
 w is of form : (76)+7 is divisible by 13
 w is of form : (76)+7 is divisible by 3

Thus we have a covering set with only three primes }. This is only possible because the sequence gives integer terms only for odd n.

A covering set also occurs in the sequence:

 (343·10n − 1) / 9 or 381+.

Here, it can be shown that:
 If , then  is divisible by 3.
 If , then  is divisible by 37.
Since  can be written as 23+, for the sequence 381+, we have a covering set of {3, 37, 23+} – a covering set with infinitely many terms.

The status for (343×10n − 1)/9 is like that for 3511808×63n + 1:

 If , then  is divisible by 37.
 If , then  is divisible by 109.
 If , then  algebraically factors as 

Thus we have a covering of {37, 109, 152×63 + 1, 152×632 + 1, 152×633 + 1, ...} or {37, 109, 2Q0+1 in base 63} – a covering set with infinitely many terms.

A more simple example is 4×9n − 1, it is equal to (2×3n − 1) × (2×3n + 1), thus its covering sets are } and }, more generally, if k and b are both r-th powers for an odd r > 1, then k×bn + 1 cannot be prime, and if k and b are both r-th powers for an r > 1 then k×bn − 1 cannot be prime.

Another example is 1369×30n − 1, its covering is {7, 13, 19, 37×30k − 1 (k = 1, 2, 3, ...)}

See also
 Covering system

Notes

References

External links
 Problem 49: Sierpinski-like numbers

Covering set